DSC International School (formerly known as Delia School of Canada) is a Canadian international private school in Hong Kong.

The school was founded in 1986 which offers Ontario curriculum (registered in the province of Ontario as an international private school). It has students from over 50 countries and offers kindergarten, primary and secondary education in 3 separate buildings. The school was first intended as a local school for the new residential development in Taikoo Shing.

After completing Ontario program of study, and having met all graduation requirements, DSC students are awarded the Ontario Secondary School Diploma (OSSD). Graduates from DSC have routinely been accepted into top universities worldwide.

Early Years
Early Years Programme provides 3 to 5 year-olds with multiple opportunities to develop the knowledge and skills within the four frames of our play and inquiry-based curriculum.

Elementary
Elementary Programme focuses on literacy, numeracy, STEAM, and passion projects across all grades. Our Elementary students take the following courses: English, Literacy, Mathematics, Science and Technology, Social Studies, Health and Physical Education, the Arts (Drama, Dance, Visual Arts, and Music) and International Languages (French, Japanese or Putonghua).

Secondary
Secondary Program consists of Middle School (Grades 7 and 8) and High School (Grades 9 through 12).  Middle School section is designed to create a smooth transition from Elementary to Secondary.  Students in Grades 7 and 8 have a rotary system where they travel with their homeroom to specialised subject teachers throughout the day.   

The school currently offers the Ontario curriculum. However, Alberta Education was first introduced and offered in the Taikoo Shing campus for Grade 1 to Grade 6 in September 2015. In September 2018, the Alberta curriculum section moved into a newly renovated home in Kwun Tong (formerly known as Delia Memorial School (Yuet Wah) ), provides education for Grade 1 to Grade 9 students. It is an Accredited International School that implements the Alberta Program of Studies, which is internationally recognized curriculum from the province of Alberta, Canada.

From 2020, the school began to merge its Kowloon East campus with its main campus in Taikoo Shing, students there were also relocated to the Taikoo Shing campus by 2021. The campus was converted into the secondary campus for Nord Anglia International School Hong Kong.

OSSD+ Signature Programme
OSSD + Signature Programme allows students to focus on a specialised academic discipline, enhanced community outreach and leadership development, real-world experience, and career mentorship through work placement. Our bespoke programmes offer a great opportunity to maximise the high school experience and acquire the skills necessary to make a positive difference in the local and global communities.

References

External links 
 

Educational institutions established in 1986
International schools in Hong Kong
Primary schools in Hong Kong
Secondary schools in Hong Kong
1986 establishments in Hong Kong